The Scottish War Emergency League was a football league competition set up in the 1939–40 season of Scottish football, after the usual official competitions were suspended due to the outbreak of World War II.

The Scottish Football League officially suspended its competition on 13 September 1939 and set up a committee to investigate the possibility of regional league competitions. These were rubber-stamped on 26 September after the Home Secretary had granted permission, they commenced a month later. There were two divisions; eastern and western; each consisting of 16 clubs. This left six of the previous league clubs; Montrose, Brechin City, Forfar Athletic, Leith Athletic, Edinburgh City and East Stirlingshire.

Cowdenbeath resigned halfway through the season, they had played all the other clubs once and so their record was allowed to stand. The competition was completed by a play-off between the two divisional winners, who were Rangers and Falkirk; Rangers won 2–1 at Hampden Park.

For the following season, competitions were organised separately in different parts of the country: the Southern Football League and the North Eastern Football League, which lasted until the resumption of official competitions in 1946 (although the Southern League 'absorbed' the North Eastern League in the 1945–46 season).

Western division

Eastern division

Play-off

Teams

References

Wartime football in Scotland
1939–40 in Scottish football
Defunct football leagues in Scotland